Li Haoyuan (born April 10, 1989 in Shanxi) is a Chinese footballer (Midfielder).

External links
 Li Hao Yuan at liga-indonesia.co.id
 

1989 births
Living people
Sportspeople from Taiyuan
Association football forwards
Chinese footballers
Footballers from Shanxi
Chinese expatriate footballers
NK Žepče players
Shenzhen F.C. players
Persiwa Wamena players
Jiangxi Beidamen F.C. players
Liga 1 (Indonesia) players
Chinese expatriate sportspeople in Indonesia
Expatriate footballers in Indonesia
Chinese expatriate sportspeople in Bosnia and Herzegovina
Expatriate footballers in Bosnia and Herzegovina